Myrna Herzog (born in Rio de Janeiro, 1 December 1951) is a Brazilian born Israeli musician, player of the viol/viola da gamba and baroque cello, conductor, and researcher in the field of viols.

Musical career
The Brazilian-born Herzog started her professional career in 1972 as one of the winners of the Young Soloists competition of the Brazilian Symphony Orchestra (OSB). Her early music involved the groups Kalenda Maya (1970–72) and Pro-Arte Antiqua (1971–74). In 1973 she founded Quadro Cervantes with Rosana Lanzelotte. In 1983 she founded Brazil's first Baroque Orchestra Academia Antiqua Pro-Arte. In 1992 Herzog immigrated to Israel, where she taught the first generation of sabra viola da gamba players.

Dr. Herzog is known to have studied the viol with Judith Davidoff and Wieland Kuijken. Since 1998, she has been the musical director and conductor of the Ensemble PHOENIX of early instruments.

Herzog has also worked in opera. Notably, she transcribed, edited, cast, directed, and fully staged the 13th-century Play of Daniel and the Baroque opera La púrpura de la rosa.

As a viola da gamba soloist, Myrna has performed throughout Europe, South America, the US, and Israel. She participated in the Israeli premiere of the Passions (Bach) with the Israel Philharmonic, performing solos with the viola da gamba. Myrna Herzog has recorded for labels as a conductor and as a performer on the viol, quinton, vielle, baroque cello, and modern cello. She has a doctorate degree in music from Bar-Ilan University. She recently held workshops on baroque music for conductors in Brazil and at the Royal Academy of Music and Dance in London.

Recordings

 Quadro Cervantes, Música Medieval, Renascentista e Barroca. Brazil 1979. Vinyl, Continental (3) – 1-35-404-012
 Canto Lunar, Music by Denise Emmer. Vinyl 1982 RGE – 308.6029 
 Quadro Cervantes, Telemann. Brazil 1984. Vinyl, Barclay- 4192621 
 Concerto BHU. Quadro Cervantes, Coro de Câmera Pro-Arte, Rosana Lanzelotte, Settecento (3xLP, Box) no number	1989 
 François Couperin: Pièces de Clavecin à deux violes. Myrna Herzog, Giomar Sthel, Ensemble PHOENIX. Tratore 2020.
 Wieland Kuijken live in Rio. Wieland Kuijken, Myrna Herzog, Rosana Lanzelotte. Recorded in 1988. Released Tratore 2020.
 Uri Brener: Spanish Lamento. Ensemble PHOENIX & Myrna Herzog. Tratore 2021 
 BACH GOLDBERG VARIATIONS arranged by Bernard Labadie. Ensemble PHOENIX & Myrna Herzog. Tratore 2022 
 Hidden Pathways: David Loeb and others. 2022 Centaur Records Inc, CRC 3920
 CHOOSE LIFE, Music for solo viola da gamba. Tratore 2022.

Publications

Dr Herzog's articles have appeared in journals and books and she is a contributor to The New Grove Dictionary of Music and Musicians.

Articles

 The Division Viol, an overview. Journal of The Viola da Gamba Society of Great Britain 2015-16, pp. 1–25 
 Stradivari's Viols, The Galpin Society Journal, Vol. 57 (May, 2004), pp. 183–194, 216
 Is the Quinton a Viol? A Puzzle Unraveled
 Violin Traits in Italian Viol Building, Rule or Exception?
 Stradivari's Viols, The Galpin Society Journal, Vol. 57 (May, 2004), pp. 183–194, 216
 The Viol in Bach’s Passion’s: A Performer’s notes. Journal of the  Viola da Gamba Society of America 33, 1996:30-46. 
 Finding out the True Identity of the Castagneri Viol: a Detective Story.  Journal of  the Viola da Gamba Society of America 31, 1994: 25-43.
 Preface and Revision to Nicolas Harnoncourt's Musica, o Discurso dos Sons, the Brazilian translation of Musik als klangrede wege zu eigem neuen musikverstandnis, Rio de Janeiro: Zahar, 1988.
 Por que instrumentos de época? (Why period instruments?) - by request of Polygram Records, 1987, brochure attached to all records of the Florilegium Series; also printed in Christopher Hogwood's Academy of Ancient Music concert programs in Brazil and Argentina.

Studio de Musica Antiga II and III, Rio: Editora Universitaria Santa Ursula, 1987-88

 "Por que instrumentos de época?" (Why Period Instruments? ) Expanded version, 1987.
 "Algumas idéias sobre a execução do continuo em instrumentos de arco" (Some Thoughts about the Execution of Continuo on Bowed Instruments), 1988.

Diálogo Médico Roche Magazine, three series (Music from Renaissance to Impressionism, History of Musical Instruments, Music in Colonial Brazil), 1986, 1988

 "Academias Renascentistas, berco dos concertos publicos" (Renaissance Academias, Cradle of the Public Concerts) - vol.12, no1, 1986
 "A Música segundo a fantasia do artista" (Music According to the Artist's Fantasy) - vol.12, no2, 1986
 "Barroco - porque instrumentos originais (I)" (Baroque - Why Original Instruments I) - vol.12, no3, 1986
 "Barroco - porque instrumentos originais (II)" (Baroque - Why Original Instruments II) - vol.12, no4, 1986
 "Rococó, o estilo maldito" (Rococo, the Damned Style) - vol.12, no5, 1986
 "Tempo de transição: Beethoven" (Transition Time: Beethoven) - vol.12, no6, 1986
 "Debussy e Rameau - Revoluco~es na Musica" (Debussy and Rameau, Revolutions in Music) - vol.12, no7, 1986
 "Do Rebab ao violino eletrico" (From the Rebab to the Electric Violin) - vol. 14, no1, 1988
 "Flauta - o instrumento chora~o por excelencia" (Flute, Chora~o by Definition) - vol.14, no2, 1988
 "O bandolim, esse seresteiro..." (The Mandoline, this Serenader...) - vol.14, no3, 1988
 "Pianos" - vol.14, no4, 1988
 "Da guitarra ao violão (e a guitarra eletrica)" (From Guitarra to Guitar - and to Electric Guitar) - vol.14, no5, 1988
 "Órgão - o rei dos instrumentos" (Organ, the King of the Instruments) - vol.14, no6, 1988
 "Música no Brasil colonial: Sec. XVI - O descobrimento" (Music in Colonial Brazil: Sixteenth Century, Discovery) - vol.14, no 7, 1988
 "Música no Brasil colonial: Pernambuco" (Music in Colonial Brazil: Pernambuco)- vol.14, no 8, 1988
 "Música na Bahia Colonial" (Music at Colonial Bahia) - vol 14, no 9, 1988

Aonde Vamos (Where Are We Going)? weekly magazine, Rio de Janeiro, 1973-75

 "Agradável surpresa" (Agreeable Surprise) - 28 June 1973
 "Julho em Israel" (July in Israel) - 23 August 1973
 "Bach - em flauta e cravo" (Bach - with Flute and Harpsichord) - 6/09/73
 "Redescobrindo Salomone Rossi" (Redescovering Salomone Rossi) - 13 and 20 September 1973
 "Kubala em grande forma" (Kubala in Great Shape)- 28 September 1973
 "Classicos em FM" (Classics in FM) - 18 October 1973
 "Sobre a importancia da musica como meio de comunicaca~o" (On the Importance of Music as Means of Communication) - 25 October 1973
 "Casals - morre um grande homem" (Casals - a Great Man Dies) - 1/11/73
 "Duas notas" (Two Notes) - 15 November 1973
 "Trio Eolio" - 29 November 1973
 "Vicky Adler no Ibam" (Vicky Adler at Ibam) - 13 December 1973
 "David, musico e rei" (David, Musician and King) - 3/01/74
 "Uma opera na TV" (An Opera on TV) - 10/01/74
 "Conversando com Morelenbaum" (Talking to Morelenbaum)- 17 January 1974
 "O inacreditavel Anner Bylsma" (The Unbelievable Anner Bylsma) - 24 January 1974
 "Schoenberg e o Seculo XX" (Schoenberg and the Twentieth Century) - 31 January 1974
 "Casals, Tortelier, Rostropovich" - 7/02/74
 "Calor e música - antagônicos?" (Heat and Music - antagonistic?) - 14 February 1974
 "Aos pais" (To Parents)  - 7/03/74
 "Música para milhões" (Music for Millions) - 14 March 1974
 "O fenômeno Assad" (The Assad Phenomenon) - 21 March 1974
 "Dolmetsch e a primeira flauta doce moderna" (Dolmetsch and the First Modern Recorder) - 28 March 1974
 "Ibam inicia temporada" (Ibam Begins its Season) - 4/04/74
 "Excelente recital Botelho + Alimonda" - 23 April 1974
 "O Poder da Musica ou Alexander's Feast" (The Power of Music or Alexander's Feast) - 25/04 and 2/05/74
 "O feiticeiro Alfred Deller" (Alfred Deller, the Sorcerer) - 16 May 1974
 "Virtuose a antiga" (Old Style Virtuoso) - 23 May 1974
 "Brahms & Stradivarius" - 30 May 1974
 "Banda Antiqua" - 13 June 1974
 "O Descobrimento da America" (The Discovery of America) - 20 June 1974
 "Musicoterapia" (Musicotherapy) - 27 June 1974
 "Dos cuidados com o instrumento musical" (On the Cares with the Musical Instrument) - 4/07/74
 "Ouvir melhor" (To Listen Better) - 11/07/74
 "A America e a cultura oriental" (America and the Oriental Culture) - 18 July 1974
 "Conversando com Judith Davidoff" (Talking to Judith Davidoff) - 15 August 1974
 "Israel e Wagner" (Israel and Wagner) - 22 August 1974
 "Ricardo Kanji no Brasil" (Ricardo Kanji in Brazil) - 29 August 1974
 "Orquestra Hebraica-Rio" - 5 and 12/09/74
 "Kol Nidre na Sala Cecilia Meirelles" (Kol Nidre at Cecilia Meirelles Hall) - 3/10/74
 "Yuval Piano Trio" - 3/10/74
 "Um senhor violinista: Paulo Bosisio" (A Master Violinist: Paulo Bosisio) - 10/10/74
 "Concursos e seus criterios" (Contests and their Criteria) - 17 October 1974
 "Virtuose israelense" (Israeli Virtuoso) - 31 October 1974
 "O trabalho de Idelsohn" (Idelsohn's Work) - 14 November 1974
 "Maria Domicia: voz internacional" (Maria Domicia: International Voice) - 28 November 1974
 "Concurso Internacional Villa-Lobos" (Villa-Lobos International Contest) - 5/12/74
 "Collegium Musicum Pro-Arte" - 12/12/74
 "Música e anti-semitismo" (Music and Anti-semitism) - 9/01/75
 "Zvi Zeitlin e Miguel Proenca" - 15 June 1975
 "Andre Navarra" - 30 June 1975

Translations

Karas, Joza. "Musica em Terezin" (Music in Terezin). Aonde Vamos?, 30 January 1975
Talbot, Michael. Vivaldi.  BBC Music Guides series. Translation of the first English edition, 1979. Rio de Janeiro: Zahar, 1985.

References

External links

Ensemble PHOENIX official website
2013 Interview with Pamela Hickman 

1951 births
Brazilian conductors (music)
Israeli conductors (music)
Brazilian classical musicians
Israeli performers of early music
Women performers of early music
Viol players
Brazilian violists
Living people
21st-century conductors (music)
21st-century violists